Roberto Plantier (born May 26, 1979, Mexico City, Distrito Federal, Mexico), is a Mexican actor of telenovelas.

Filmography

References

External links 

1979 births
Living people
Mexican male telenovela actors
Mexican male television actors
Male actors from Mexico City
21st-century Mexican male actors